Minories is the name of a small former administrative unit, and also of a street in central London. Both the street and the former administrative area take their name from the Abbey of the Minoresses of St. Clare without Aldgate.

Both are positioned just to the east of, and outside, the line of London's former defensive walls, in London's East End. The area of the former administrative unit was outside the City of London (most recently in the London Borough of Tower Hamlets), with the street partially in the City and partly in Tower Hamlets. Boundary changes in 1994 mean the area of both is now wholly within the City of London.

Toponymy
Minories' name is derived from the former Abbey of the Minoresses of St. Clare without Aldgate, a house of the Poor Clares, members of the Order of St Clare, founded in 1294 and known generally in medieval England as "minoresses". A "minoress" was a nun in the Second Order of the Order of Friars Minor known as Franciscans. (A small side-road off Minories is named St. Clare Street.) The name can be found in other English towns, including Birmingham, Colchester, Newcastle upon Tyne and Stratford-upon-Avon.

Governance

Minories was in the ancient parish of St Botolph without Aldgate until 1557, when it became extra-parochial.

The area was a papal peculiar outside the jurisdiction of the English bishops. The abbey was dissolved in 1539, the property passing to the Crown. The chapel of the former abbey became the Church of Holy Trinity, Minories, and other buildings were used as an armoury and later as a workhouse. In 1686, the area became part of the Liberties of the Tower of London. The Minories area historically hosted a large Jewish community.

Minories Holy Trinity, also known as Minories Holy Trinity, was abolished as a civil parish in 1895 and absorbed into the parish of Whitechapel.

The street
The modern street named Minories runs north–south with traffic flowing both-ways from Aldgate to Tower Hill; it is part of the A1211 road between the Barbican and Whitechapel. The border between the City and the London Borough of Tower Hamlets ran haphazardly between Minories and nearby Mansell Street until boundary changes in 1994 relocated the present-day border along Mansell Street, so that Minories is now within the City of London. Aldgate Underground station is at the northern end of Minories, on Aldgate High Street.

Roman cemetery
In September 2013, a well-preserved Roman statue of an eagle with a snake in its mouth, thought to have been part of a funerary monument, was discovered on a building site on the street, close to its junction with Aldgate High Street. Burials were forbidden within the inhabited area in the Roman period, so the City's defensive wall was ringed by many large cemeteries. The statue is considered to be one of the best examples of Romano-British sculpture in existence.

Minories railway station
The street gave its name to Minories railway station, built in 1840 as a part of the London and Blackwall Railway – a  cable railway. The site is now occupied by the Docklands Light Railway (DLR) station Tower Gateway, which opened in 1989 as the system's western terminus. The DLR was extended westward in 1991 to Bank, leaving Tower Gateway as a secondary alternative terminus.

References

Sources

Areas of London
Districts of the City of London
Streets in the City of London
Odonyms referring to religion
Former civil parishes in London
Bills of mortality parishes